Year 1322 (MCCCXXII) was a common year starting on Friday (link will display the full calendar) of the Julian calendar.

Events 
 January–December 
 January 6 – Stephen Uroš III Dečanski is crowned King of Serbia, having defeated his half-brother Stefan Konstantin in battle.
 February 13
The central tower of Ely Cathedral in England falls, on the night of February 12th-13th.
The Dalmatian house of Keglević (generatio Percal) is mentioned in a document for the first time.
 March 10 – Despenser War - Battle of Burton Bridge: Edward II of England drives off rebel forces.
 March 16 – Battle of Boroughbridge: Edward II of England defeats several rebellious barons.
 June 24 – Jews are expelled from France for the third time.
 September 28 – Battle of Mühldorf: Bavaria defeats Austria.
 October 8 – Mladen II Šubić of Bribir, defeated in the battle of Bliska, is arrested by the Parliament.
 October 14 –  First War of Scottish Independence - Battle of Old Byland: Robert the Bruce of Scotland defeats English troops in North Yorkshire.

Births 
 January 11 – Emperor Kōmyō of Japan (d. 1380)
 February 12 – John Henry, Margrave of Moravia (d. 1375)
 June 24 – Joanna, Duchess of Brabant (d. 1406)
 date unknown
 Blessed Imelda Lambertini, Italian patroness of First Communion (d. 1333)
 King Michael Asen IV of Bulgaria (d. 1355)

Deaths 
 January 3 – King Philip V of France (b. 1293)
 January 10 – Petrus Aureolus, scholastic philosopher
 March 16 – Humphrey de Bohun, 4th Earl of Hereford, English soldier (b. 1276)
 March 22 – Thomas, Earl of Lancaster, English politician (b. 1278)
 April 14 – Bartholomew de Badlesmere, 1st Baron Badlesmere, English soldier (b. 1275)
 April 20 – Blessed Simon Rinalducci, Italian Augustinian friar
 April 22 – Francis of Fabriano, Italian writer (b. 1251)
 August 10 – John of La Verna, Italian ascetic (b. 1259)
 August 25 – Beatrice of Silesia, queen consort of Germany (b. c. 1292)
 September 14 – Joan of Lusignan, Dame de Lusignan (approximate date)
 September 17 – Robert III, Count of Flanders (b. 1249)
 December 3 – Maud Chaworth, Countess of Leicester (b. 1282)
 date unknown
 Ma Duanlin, Chinese historian (b. 1245)
 Bertha van Heukelom, Dutch heroine
 Theodore Svetoslav of Bulgaria, emperor of Bulgaria
 Zhao Mengfu, Chinese scholar, painter and calligrapher (b. 1254)

References